The 2010 Mountain West Conference football season was the 12th since eight former members of the Western Athletic Conference banded together to form the MW.

This was the last season for two of the conference's charter members. Utah left the MW to join the Pac-10 in 2011. At the same time, the Utes' historic rival, BYU, will become a football independent and join the West Coast Conference in other sports. In the 2011 season, Boise State joined from the WAC, while three other WAC members, Fresno State, Hawaii and Nevada, have accepted invitations to join the MW in 2012. For more details on these developments, see 2010 NCAA conference realignment.

Previous season
TCU won its second Mountain West Conference Championship during an undefeated regular season. TCU beat Wisconsin in the Rose Bowl.

Rankings

Mountain West vs. BCS matchups

Schedule

Week one

Week two

Week three

Week four

Week five

Week six

Week seven

Week eight

Week nine

Week ten

Week eleven

Week twelve

Week thirteen

Week fourteen

Statistics
Team
 Scoring offense: TCU (520 points, 43.3 average)
 Scoring defense: TCU (137 points, 11.4 average)
 Rushing offense: Air Force (317.9 yards per game)
 Rushing defense: TCU (89.2 yards per game)
 Pass offense: San Diego State (297.0 yards per game)
 Total offense: TCU (491.5 yards per game)

Bowl games
Mountain West teams finished 4–1 in bowl games in 2011, the best record out of all conferences to win the Bowl Challenge Cup for the second consecutive year.

Home attendance

References